The Oracle Challenger Series – Indian Wells is a professional tennis tournament played on hard courts. It is currently part of the ATP Challenger Tour and the WTA 125K series. It is held annually in Indian Wells, California, United States since 2018. The two American men and two American women with the most points in the series receive wild cards to their respective singles events at the Indian Wells Masters.

Past finals

Men's singles

Women's singles

Men's doubles

Women's doubles

References

External links
 Official website

 
ATP Challenger Tour
WTA 125 tournaments
Hard court tennis tournaments in the United States
Tennis tournaments in California
2018 establishments in California
Recurring sporting events established in 2018
Sports in Riverside County, California
Indian Wells, California